The locomotives of the Highland Railway were used by the Highland Railway to operate its lines in the north of Scotland. The Highland Railway locomotive works was at Lochgorm, Inverness. The works had been built about 1855 by the Inverness and Nairn Railway. The locomotive classes are listed under the names of the railway's Locomotive Superintendents.

Locomotives

William Barclay 1855–69

During Barclay's incumbency as locomotive superintendent various 2-2-2 and 2-4-0 locomotives were built, along with a solitary 0-4-0T. An 0-4-0ST was also inherited from the Findhorn Railway. Many of Barclay's locomotives would later be rebuilt by Stroudley or Jones - most of the 2-2-2s ended up as 2-4-0s and one became a 2-2-2T, a pair of 2-4-0s became 4-4-0s and the 0-4-0T became an 0-4-2T. Only 4 much rebuilt Barclay locomotives (all 2-4-0s) were still in stock at the time of the Grouping.

William Stroudley 1865–69
William Stroudley produced only one new design, an 0-6-0ST of which 3 were built. These survived to pass into LMS ownership.

David Jones 1870–96
David Jones designed several classes of 4-4-0, and was also notable for introducing the 4-6-0 wheel arrangement to the UK. He also produced small numbers of 0-4-4ST, 2-4-0, 2-4-0T and 4-4-0T locomotives. Of 88 engines built to Jones' design (including 3 built as late as 1917), 74 passed to the LMS in 1923.  A small 2-4-0T purchased secondhand from the Duke of Sutherland also made into LMS ownership.

Peter Drummond 1896–1912
Under Peter Drummond, new 0-4-4T, 0-6-0T, 0-6-4T, 0-6-0, 4-4-0 and 4-6-0 designs emerged. All 72 locomotives passed to the LMS.

Frederick George Smith 1912–15
Fredrick George Smith's brief tenure was cut short by a dispute over his sole design, the 'River' Class 4-6-0. Six locomotives were built, but they were (wrongly) considered to be too heavy for the Highland Railway, and were sold to the Caledonian Railway without being used.

Christopher Cumming 1915–22
Christopher Cumming designed one class of 4-4-0 and two types of 4-6-0, totalling 18 locomotives, which all passed to the LMS.

London, Midland and Scottish Railway

The Highland Railway was absorbed by the London, Midland and Scottish Railway (LMS) in 1923 and its locomotives were taken into LMS stock. Despite their small numbers, quite a few Highland Railway classes survived well into the LMS era, and even into the 1950s.

Preservation
Jones Goods 103, withdrawn by the LMS, is the only Highland Railway locomotive to have been preserved. A Drummond Small Ben 4-4-0, Ben Alder, was retained for many years, with a view to preservation, before being scrapped in 1966.

References

Highland Railway

Highland Railway